Čečina is a village situated in Doljevac municipality, Nišava District in Serbia.

References

Populated places in Nišava District